The Honours (Prevention of Abuses) Act 1925 is an Act of the Parliament of the United Kingdom, that makes the sale of peerages or any other honours illegal. The act was passed by the Parliament in the wake of David Lloyd George's 1922 cash-for-honours scandal. In 2006 a number of people connected to the Labour Party government of Tony Blair were interviewed voluntarily at Downing Street in connection with alleged offences under the 1925 Act.

Lloyd George honours scandal
The act was brought in after the Liberal Party government of David Lloyd George was severely embarrassed peddling honours for party funds. The practice was legal and dated back several decades partly for new money to discreetly acquire titles; Lloyd George made the practice more systematic and more brazen, charging £10,000 for a knighthood, £30,000 for baronetcy, and £50,000 upwards for a peerage.  The practice came to a halt with the notorious 1922 Birthday Honours List, which contained the names of, Sir Joseph Robinson, a South African gold and diamond magnate who had been convicted of fraud and fined half a million pounds a few months earlier; Sir William Vestey, a multi-millionaire meat importer notorious for his tax evasion; Samuel Waring, who had been accused of war profiteering; and Archibald Williamson, whose oil firm had allegedly traded with the enemy during the war.

Prime Minister Lloyd George in mid-1922 was fast losing his political support, and his sales were denounced in the House of Lords as an abuse of the Prime Minister's powers of patronage.

Only one person has ever been convicted under the Act – Maundy Gregory, Lloyd George's "honours broker", in 1933 – whose same behaviour in 1918 was the main cause of the Act in the first place. Gregory's 1933 conviction was secured over his attempts to broker the selling of Vatican knighthoods in the UK. To this date, the Act has never been successfully used to convict anyone involved in the sale of UK honours.

2006: Cash for honours

In March 2006, following complaints by Scottish National Party MP Angus MacNeil, the Metropolitan Police started investigating possible breaches of the Act. A total of £5 million in loans was given by four wealthy businessmen to the Labour Party during the 2005 general election campaign, the men were subsequently nominated by Tony Blair for peerages. All four of the peerages were blocked by the House of Lords appointments commission. The police inquiries led to 136 people being interviewed, including Tony Blair, the first prime minister to be questioned by police as part of a political corruption inquiry, albeit "as a witness rather than a suspect". In 2007, after a £1.4 million, 19-month investigation, the police handed a 216-page report with 6,300 supporting documents to the Crown Prosecution Service which later announced it had insufficient evidence to bring charges against anyone.

2021: Cash for favours scandal
In September 2021, Michael Fawcett, Prince Charles's closest aide, "stepped down temporarily" as chief executive of The Prince's Foundation, after an investigation by The Sunday Times and the Mail on Sunday reported that he "offered to help to secure a knighthood and British citizenship" for Mahfouz Marei Mubarak bin Mahfouz, a Saudi businessman who donated £1.5m to Prince Charles's charities. William Bortrick, the editor and owner of Burke's Peerage, was named by the Sunday Times as the alleged fixer at the heart of the claims. Bortrick is said to have received thousands of pounds to secure the honour. According to the Metropolitan Police, at least two complaints were made calling for an investigation into whether Prince Charles or Michael Fawcett breached the 1925 Act. In February 2022 the Metropolitan Police launched an investigation into the cash-for-honours allegations linked to Charles' charity The Prince's Foundation. On 6 September 2022, officers interviewed under caution, a man in his fifties and a man in his forties. On 31 October 2022, the Metropolitan Police passed their evidence to the Crown Prosecution Service for deliberation.

See also
Cash for Honours, in 21st century politics
Political funding in the United Kingdom

References

Further reading
 Jenkins, T. A. "The funding of the Liberal Unionist party and the honours system." English Historical Review 105.417 (1990): 920–938. in JSTOR 
 Hanham, H.J. "The sale of honours in late Victorian England." Victorian Studies 3#3 (1960): 277–289. in JSTOR
 Rowland, Peter. Lloyd George (1975) pp 447–48, 574–78, 631–33.

External links 
 
 BBC News article about the announcement of the investigation
 Posting from the blog  of BBC News political editor Nick Robinson about the Act and the possibility of prosecutions, 21 March 2006.

British honours system
United Kingdom Acts of Parliament 1925
Political funding in the United Kingdom